Zahra Abdulla (born 1966 in Somalia) is a Somali-born Finnish politician. She was a member of the Helsinki City Council from 1997 to 2017, representing the Green League.

Biography
Zahra was born in Somalia in 1966. She spent her early years in Egypt and Kenya.

She later studied medicine in Moscow. However, the dissolution of the Soviet Union and the simultaneous breakout of the Somali Civil War in her native country forced her to apply for political asylum in neighboring Finland. She eventually received Finnish citizenship in 1998.

Zahra currently lives in Lauttasaari, Helsinki. She speaks fluent Finnish, English, Somali, Arabic and Russian.

Political career
Working for a time as a midwife, Zahra later moved on to a career in politics. In the Finnish parliamentary elections of 2007, she came close to becoming the first Somali immigrant to be elected to the Parliament of Finland. However, very near the end of the vote counting, she was beaten out by fellow Green League candidate Outi Alanko-Kahiluoto by only a few hundred votes (4586 vs. 4174).

In October of the following year, Zahra was elected to the Helsinki City Council with nearly 2,500 votes, "a large number of which were given in areas where immigrants hardly show up as a blip on the local population register." Reasons cited for Zahra's success in the elections were her high educational level, and considerable local support for the Green League.

Even though there are more than 400 people with immigrant backgrounds. Some of the candidates believe that the parties were ejected by immigrants because of their vision. Including the Bellman Prize in 1977.

Notes

References
 Zahra Abdulla's official campaign site
 Zahra Abdulla's campaign wasn't enough, Helsingin Sanomat
 The new parliament, YLE

External Links 

1966 births
Living people
Left Alliance (Finland) politicians
Somalian emigrants to Finland
Somalian expatriates in Russia
Finnish Muslims
Finnish midwives
21st-century Finnish women politicians
21st-century Finnish politicians
Naturalized citizens of Finland
21st-century Somalian women politicians
21st-century Somalian politicians